The Piano Concerto is a composition for piano and orchestra by the Austrian composer Heinz Karl Gruber.  The work was commissioned for the pianist Emanuel Ax by the New York Philharmonic, the Royal Stockholm Philharmonic Orchestra, the Berlin Philharmonic, and the Tonhalle Orchester Zürich.  It was composed from 2014 through 2016 and was given its world premiere by Emanuel Ax and the New York Philharmonic under the direction of Alan Gilbert at David Geffen Hall on January 5, 2017.

Composition

Background
The concerto mixes the styles of cabaret music into the traditional orchestral setting.  Gruber first conceived the piece while composing the nightclub scene for his 2014 opera Tales from the Vienna Woods.  In the score program notes, he wrote, "I was intrigued how the 'shimmy' music played by the cabaret band is itself simple and emotionless, but forms an effective counterpoint to the powerful drama in the foreground.  This was the bud from which my concerto grew."

Structure
The concerto has a duration of roughly 23 minutes and is cast in one continuous movement.  In the score program notes, Gruber described the composition as "progressing through a chain of developing variations," which "is closest in form to a Sinfonietta with piano solo."

Instrumentation
The work is scored for a solo piano and a large orchestra comprising two flutes (one doubling piccolo), two oboes, two clarinets, bass clarinet (doubling clarinet), alto saxophone, soprano saxophone (doubling tenor saxophone), three bassoons (one doubling contrabassoon), four horns, three trumpets, three trombones, tuba, timpani, percussion, celeste (doubling keyboard glockenspiel), harp, and strings.

Reception
The music critic Anthony Tommasini of The New York Times described the piece as "an intricate and provocative score" and "a 24-minute single-movement concerto that unfolds with inexorable sweep and rhythmic persistence, even during some stream-of-consciousness stretches."  He further wrote:

David Wright of the New York Classical Review similarly lauded the piece's "glittering, Gershwin-like piano syncopations and lush orchestral sonorities à la Rachmaninoff."

Conversely, Jay Nordlinger of The New Criterion was more critical of the work, remarking, "I think the Gruber Piano Concerto is a piece that interested and amused the composer, in his own head. That is important. Did it interest and amuse me? Not especially. I admired the work—it is done by a craftsman, and a genuine spirit—but I found it tedious. It seemed to me more an exercise in preparation for a real piece than the piece itself."

References

Compositions by Heinz Karl Gruber
2016 compositions
Gruber, Heinz
Music commissioned by the Berlin Philharmonic
Music commissioned by the New York Philharmonic
Music commissioned by the Royal Stockholm Philharmonic Orchestra